Lee Chamberlin (born Alverta LaPallo; February 14, 1938 – May 25, 2014) was an American theatrical, film and television actress.

Early life
Chamberlin was born in New York City. She was the daughter of Ida Roberta (née Small) and Brazilian author Bernando LaPallo (1901–2015)..  LaPallo was deemed at one point to be the oldest living man in the United States, dying at age 114 in Tempe, Arizona in 2015.

Career

Chamberlin began her career in 1968 in Slave Ship, a stage production based on the outline of LeRoi Jones later known as Amiri Baraka. She appeared at The Orpheum Theatre in a musical production called Do Your Own Thing, based on Shakespeare's Twelfth Night, and in an off-Broadway production, The Believers. She played Cordelia opposite James Earl Jones's King Lear in 1974 in the Delacorte Theatre at the New York Shakespeare in the Park Festival. She went on to win six AUDELCO Awards for Excellence in Black Theater on November 21, 1988, for her musical play Struttin’, performed at the Rosetta LeNoire AMAS Repertory Theater. She also appeared in the play Hospice produced at The Henry Street Settlement Theatre in Lower Manhattan.

Chamberlin wrote and acted in her one-woman play Objects in the Mirror are Closer than They Seem first as a reading in Miami, Florida, and later in 2010 as part of The Kitchen Theatre's Counter series in Ithaca, New York from February 10–14 in a sold-out run. The play was directed by Rachel Lampert. Chamberlin founded a non-profit organization, Lee Chamberlin's Playwrights' Inn Project Inc., establishing it in France to nurture the work of African American playwrights.

Chamberlin was a regular performer during the first two years of the esteemed series The Electric Company, and she made guest appearances in the television series What's Happening!!, Diff'rent Strokes, and NYPD Blue. In 1979, she played the wife of James Earl Jones's character on the short-lived police drama Paris. Most notably she played Odile Harris in Roots: The Next Generations (1979). Her first recurring role in a major television sitcom was as Lucy Daniels in "All's Fair" from 1976-77. In the 1970s she appeared on shows such as Lou Grant and James at 16.

In the early 1980s, Chamberlin appeared on The White Shadow. Other guest spots in the 1980s included Ryan's Four and Beat Street. In 1994; she played Commander Della Thorne in Viper. In 1998, she played Dr. Timmi in The Practice, and Judge Leslie Battles in To Have and To Hold.

In 1999, Chamberlin made guest appearances on NewsRadio and Moesha. In 2000 she appeared in Any Day Now and City of Angels. From 1982-90, Chamberlin played Pat Baxter, the mother of Angela Baxter Hubbard on All My Children. In 1997, she appeared in Diagnosis Murder (television series) as Judge Gwen Mosford. In 2002, she appeared on episodes of Touched by An Angel and Judging Amy.

Chamberlin's first role in film was a small part in Up the Sandbox starring Barbra Streisand. She had a prominent role as Madame Zenobia in the film Uptown Saturday Night and the follow-up Let's Do it Again. She also appeared in several television films including Long Journey Back (1978), Brave New World (1980), and Once Upon A Family (1980). Her final film role was in the short film Habeaus Corpus (2013).

Death
Chamberlin died of cancer at the age of 76 on May 25, 2014 in Chapel Hill, North Carolina.  She was survived by a daughter, Ekayani and a son, Matthew.

Filmography

References

External links
 
 

1938 births
2014 deaths
African-American actresses
Actresses from New York City
Writers from New York City
People from Harlem
American film actresses
American sketch comedians
American soap opera actresses
American television actresses
American dramatists and playwrights
American people of Brazilian descent
20th-century American actresses
Deaths from cancer in North Carolina
20th-century African-American women
20th-century African-American people
21st-century African-American people
21st-century African-American women